The 2011 season was IFK Göteborg's 106th in existence, their 79th season in Allsvenskan and their 35th consecutive season in the league. They competed in Allsvenskan where they finished seventh for the second time in a row and Svenska Cupen where they were knocked out in the semi-finals.

Players

Squad

Youth players with first-team appearances 
Youth players who played a competitive match for the club in 2011.

Players in and out

In

Out

Squad statistics

Appearances and goals

Disciplinary record

Club

Coaching staff

Other information

Competitions

Overall

Allsvenskan

League table

Results summary

Results by round

Matches
Kickoff times are in UTC+2.

Svenska Cupen

Kickoff times are in UTC+2.

Non competitive

Pre-season
Kickoff times are in UTC+1 unless stated otherwise.

References

IFK Göteborg seasons
IFK Goteborg